Łukasz Parszczyński (born 4 May 1985 in Warsaw) is a Polish runner. He competed in the 3000 m steeplechase event at the 2012 Summer Olympics.

Competition record

†: Disqualified in the final.

References

External links
 
 

Athletes from Warsaw
Polish male middle-distance runners
Polish male steeplechase runners
1985 births
Living people
Olympic athletes of Poland
Athletes (track and field) at the 2012 Summer Olympics
Podlasie Białystok athletes
21st-century Polish people